Charles Floyd Hatcher (born July 1, 1939) is an American politician and lawyer from Georgia. He served in Congress as a Democrat.

Biography
Hatcher was born in Doerun, Georgia and served in the United States Air Force from 1958 to 1962 reaching the rank of Airman Second Class. After his military service, he attended Georgia Southern College in Statesboro in 1965 and then entered the University of Georgia School of Law in Athens. Hatcher graduated with a Juris Doctor degree in 1969, became a member of the state bar, and started practicing law in Albany, Georgia.

Hatcher served in the Georgia House of Representatives from 1973 to 1980. He was elected to six consecutive terms in the U.S. House of Representatives beginning with the election of 1980. Hatcher ran an unsuccessful bid for re-election in 1992, losing the Democratic primary to Sanford Bishop, in part because of the House banking scandal.

Personal life
He is married to former Deputy Agriculture secretary Krysta Harden.

References

 Retrieved on March 20, 2010

1939 births
Living people
People from Colquitt County, Georgia
United States Air Force airmen
University of Georgia School of Law alumni
Georgia Southern University alumni
Georgia (U.S. state) lawyers
Democratic Party members of the United States House of Representatives from Georgia (U.S. state)
Democratic Party members of the Georgia House of Representatives
20th-century American lawyers
20th-century American politicians
People from Alexandria, Virginia